Volodymyr Boyko Stadium is a multi-purpose stadium in Mariupol, Donetsk Oblast, Ukraine. It is located in a local Petrovskyi Park which is located along the highway Mariupol–Donetsk (H20).

Built in 1956, it was originally known as Novator Stadium. In 2001, it was renovated by Illich Steel and Iron Works and changed its name to Illichivets.

It is currently used mostly for football matches, and is the home of FC Mariupol. The stadium holds 12,680 people. Often the stadium is used by the national women's football team.

Since the start of the Russian occupation of Mariupol during the 2022 Russian invasion of Ukraine, the stadium buildings have been damaged by shelling and looted, and the grass pitch has withered due to a lack of maintenance.

References

External links 
Photo gallery and data at Erlebnis-Stadion.de
Senkiv, A. ''How comfortable is to attend the UPL games: Volodymyr Boyko Stadium (Наскільки комфортно ходити на матчі УПЛ: стадіон імені Володимира Бойка). Football 24. 17 April 2018.

Football venues in Donetsk Oblast
Multi-purpose stadiums in Ukraine
Sport in Mariupol
Sports venues in Donetsk Oblast
FC Mariupol